Zarley Bennett Zalapski (April 22, 1968 – December 10, 2017) was a Canadian professional ice hockey defenceman who played from 1987 to 2010.

Playing career
Zalapski's career started with the Fort Saskatchewan Traders of the Alberta Junior Hockey League. In his first season with the Traders, Zalapski tallied 70 points in 67 games, including 17 goals. Zalapski spent the next two years playing with the Canadian National Team. Zalapski was picked 4th in the 1st round by the Pittsburgh Penguins in the 1986 NHL Entry Draft. He tallied 99 goals, and 285 assists, for a total of 384 points in his 637 games in the NHL. He also registered 684 penalty minutes.

He was a member of the Canadian Olympic Hockey team in the 1988 Winter Olympics held in Calgary, Alberta. Canada would end up missing the medal podium and finished in fourth place. Although Canada lost their first game in the medal round, Zalapski played a key role in the team's victories over West Germany and Czechoslovakia.

After his 11-year career in the National Hockey League playing for the Penguins, Hartford Whalers, Calgary Flames, Montreal Canadiens, and Philadelphia Flyers, he then played for teams in hockey leagues in Germany, Italy, and Austria. He finally found his stride when in Switzerland in the Swiss National League. Zalapski retired after the 2009–10 NLB season.

Personal life
Zalapski was the son of Len and Bonnie Zalapski. His unusual first name came as a result of his father Len, a golf enthusiast, naming him after professional golfer Kermit Zarley. Zalapski had one sister, Kyla.
 
Zalapski became a Swiss citizen in 2006 through his marriage to his wife, Klaudjia. The couple had two sons, Zen and Kai.

Death
Zalapski died on December 10, 2017, at the age of 49, after complications from a viral infection. He had been hospitalized in October 2017 with viral myocarditis and was released later that month after treatment.

Following his death, his sister Kyla Zalapski wanted to know if he had any brain health issues. Zalapski had had at least two concussions in his NHL career. His sister had his brain sent to Toronto to be examined. Neuropathologist Dr. Lili-Naz Hazrati determined that Zalapski had Chronic Traumatic Encephalopathy (CTE). He also had more tau (abnormal brain protein) than found in another former NHL defenceman, Steve Montador, who died at age 35.

Awards
Named to the NHL All-Rookie Team in 1989.
Played in NHL All-Star Game (1993)

Career statistics

Regular season and playoffs

International

References

External links

1968 births
2017 deaths
Calgary Flames players
Canadian expatriate ice hockey players in Germany
Canadian expatriate ice hockey players in Sweden
Canadian expatriate ice hockey players in the United States
Canadian ice hockey defencemen
ECH Chur players
EfB Ishockey players
EHC Biel players
EHC Olten players
EHC Visp players
Fort Saskatchewan Traders players
Hartford Whalers players
HC Martigny players
HC Merano players
HC TWK Innsbruck players
Houston Aeros (1994–2013) players
Ice hockey people from Edmonton
Ice hockey players at the 1988 Winter Olympics
Ice hockey people from Alberta
Ice hockey players with chronic traumatic encephalopathy
IF Björklöven players
Kalamazoo Wings (1974–2000) players
Lausanne HC players
Long Beach Ice Dogs (IHL) players
Montreal Canadiens players
München Barons players
National Hockey League All-Stars
National Hockey League first-round draft picks
Olympic ice hockey players of Canada
Philadelphia Flyers players
Pittsburgh Penguins draft picks
Pittsburgh Penguins players
SC Rapperswil-Jona Lakers players
Utah Grizzlies (IHL) players
ZSC Lions players